ASM may refer to:

Codes
 American Samoa, ISO 3166-1 alpha-3 country code
 Asmara International Airport, IATA airport code
 Assamese language, ISO 639 language code asm

Organizations
Aare Seeland mobil, a Swiss bus and train operator
Albanian School of Magistrates
ASM Clermont Auvergne France, a rugby union club
 ASM Formule 3, a French motorsport team
 ASM International (society), formerly the American Society for Metals, a professional organization for materials scientists and metallurgists
 ASM International (company), a Dutch semiconductor company
 ASM Team, a Portuguese motorsport team in the Le Mans Series
AS Monaco FC, a French association football club
 Academy of Sciences of Moldova
 Actuarial Society of Malaysia
 American School of Milan
 American Society of Mammalogists
 American Society for Microbiology
 American Society of Muslims
 Associated Students of Madison, the student government of the University of Wisconsin- Madison
 Assotsiatsia Sovremennoi Muzyki (Ассоциация Современной Музыки (АСМ) in Russian, Association for Contemporary Music in English), a Russian organization
 Australian Society of Magicians

Military
 Academy Sergeant Major, the senior warrant officer at the Australian Defence Force Academy
 Air-to-surface missile
 Anti-ship missile
 Anti-Structures Munition
 Artificer Sergeant Major, a warrant officer appointment in the British Army's Corps of Royal Electrical and Mechanical Engineers
 Australian Service Medal

Computer science
 Assembly language
 The keyword asm to use an inline assembler in C and related languages
 ObjectWeb ASM, a Java library for bytecode modification and analysis
 Abstract state machines
 Active shape model, a deformable contour model used in computer vision
 Algorithmic state machine, for designing finite state machines
 Any-source multicast
 asm.js, a subset of the Javascript programming language
 Assembly (demo party), a demoscene event in Finland
 Automatic Storage Management, in an Oracle database
 Application Service Management
 App Shell Model, An architectural approach in PWA

Transportation
 Available seat miles of an airline, railroad, or bus route

Arts and media
 Assistant stage manager in theater
 Aktueller Software Markt, a German video game magazine
 A State of Mind - a contemporary hip hop trio currently signed with Chinese Man records

Other
 Acceleration Simulation Mode, a test used in automobile emissions control
 Acid Sphingomyelinase, an enzyme also known as Sphingomyelin phosphodiesterase 1
 Activated sludge model, in sewage treatment
 Alternating sign matrix
 Ambulance Service Medal (Australia), a civil decoration for members of the Australian Ambulance Service
 Asynchronous State Machine. Induction motor.
 The ASM Consortium or Abnormal Situation Management Consortium was foundational in the development of alarm management 
 Assistant Store Manager; lowest level of middle management in a retail organization; manages team leads and supervisory staff in large stores (think Lowe's, Costco etc. in the US; Peek & Cloppenburg in much of Europe, etc.)
 asynchronous motor

See also